Lexias dirtea, the archduke, is a species of butterfly of the family Nymphalidae.

Description
In this species sexual dichromatism is extreme. In males the uppersides of the wings are mainly velvety black, with metallic blue green on the margins, while in the females the uppersides of the wings are mainly brownish, covered by several rows of yellowish-whitish spots.

Distribution
This species can be found in India, Burma, Northern Thailand, southern China, Laos, Cambodia, Vietnam, Myanmar, Malaysia, Sumatra, Java, Borneo and the Philippines.

Habitat
It lives primarily in virgin swamp forests.

Subspecies
L. d. dirtea (north-east India, Naga Hills)
L. d. khasiana (north-east India, Assam, Burma, Yunnan)
L. d. toonchai (northern Thailand)
L. d. agosthena southern China (Kwangtung), Laos, Cambodia, Vietnam
L. d. merguia (southern Myanmar, Tenasserim, southern Thailand, Malaysia)
L. d. montana (Sumatra)
L. d. inimitabilis (Siberut, Mentawei Islands)
L. d. insulanus (Bangka, Lingga, Singkep)
L. d. javana (western Java)
L. d. aquilus (Anambas group)
L. d. baliaris (Natuna Islands)
L. d. chalcedonides (Borneo)
L. d. annae (Bawean)
L. d. palawana (Philippines, Palawan)
??L. d. iwasakii
L. d. bontouxi (southern Yunnan)

References
 BioLib.cz
 "Lexias Boisduval, 1832" at Markku Savela's Lepidoptera and Some Other Life Forms

External links
 The Archduke Reigns

Lexias
Butterflies of Asia
Butterflies of Singapore
Butterflies of Borneo
Butterflies described in 1793